Coline Serreau (born 29 October 1947) is a French actress, film director and writer.

Early life and education 
She was born in Paris, the daughter of theatre director Jean-Marie Serreau and actress Geneviève Serreau. In Paris, Serreau studied literature, music and theatre as well as the circus.

Career
In 1970, she made her debut as an actress at the Théâtre du Vieux-Colombier.

Serreau wrote her first screenplay in 1973.

Her first film, the documentary film Mais qu'est-ce qu'elles veulent? (1978), literally: But What Is It That They Want?, was a compilation of interviews with women from various backgrounds. The frankness of the statements shocked parts of the public.

Her biggest commercial success was the comedy film Three Men and a Cradle (Trois hommes et un couffin; 1985), for which she received three César Awards in 1986. It was also nominated for the Academy Award for Best Foreign Language Film.

In 1986, her first drama for the stage Lapin Lapin (Rabbit Rabbit), directed by Benno Besson, had its world premiere.  She collaborated with Besson for several years and he also staged Le théâtre de verdure (1987) and Quisaitout et Grobêta (1993).

Filmography

Awards and nominations

See also
 List of female film and television directors
 List of LGBT-related films directed by women

References

Further reading
 Colville, G. (1993). "On Coline Serreau's Mais qu'est ce qu'elles veulent? and the Problematics of Feminist Documentary". French Cinema. Nottingham French Studies. Vol. 32. No.1. pp. 84–89.

External links
 

1947 births
Living people
20th-century French actresses
20th-century French non-fiction writers
20th-century French women writers
21st-century French actresses
21st-century French non-fiction writers
21st-century French women writers
Actresses from Paris
César Award winners
French documentary filmmakers
French film actresses
French stage actresses
French women dramatists and playwrights
French women screenwriters
French screenwriters
Writers from Paris
Recipients of the Legion of Honour
French women film directors
Women documentary filmmakers